NGC 3603 is a nebula situated in the Carina–Sagittarius Arm of the Milky Way around 20,000 light-years away from the Solar System.  It is a massive H II region containing a very compact open cluster (probably a super star cluster) HD 97950.

Observations

NGC 3603 was observed by John Herschel on 14 March 1834 during his visit to South Africa, who remarked that it was "a very remarkable object...perhaps a globular cluster". Herschel catalogued it as nebula 3334 in his Results of Astronomical Observations made at the Cape of Good Hope, published in 1847. In 1864 the Royal Society published his General Catalogue of Nebulae and Clusters, where he listed it as number 2354. It was subsequently incorporated into the New General Catalogue as by J. L. E. Dreyer as NGC 3603.

The central cluster was catalogued as the star HD 97950, but has long been recognised as nebulous or multiple.  It was also noted for having an unusual emission spectrum and the spectral type was given as Oe in the Henry Draper Catalogue.  This was later refined to WN5 + O as the emission was recognised as characteristic of a Wolf–Rayet star.  Eventually, the cluster would be resolved and found to contain three of the most massive and most luminous stars known, as well as a number of luminous O class stars and many fainter stars.

Features

NGC 3603 is the most massive visible cloud of glowing gas and plasma, known as a H II region, in the Milky Way.  The central star cluster is the densest concentration of very massive stars known in the galaxy. Strong ultraviolet radiation and stellar winds have cleared the gas and dust, giving an unobscured view of the cluster.

Three prominent Wolf–Rayet stars have been detected within the cluster, all originally unresolved and known as the single star HD 97950. The brightest of the three, HD 97950A1 (or NGC 3603-A1) is actually a pair of Wolf–Rayet stars that orbit around each other once every 3.77 days. The star designated HD 97950B is a single star more massive and more luminous than either of the individual members of HD 97950A1. It is 2,880,000 times as luminous as the sun and 132 times as massive.

NGC 3603 is visible in the telescope as a small rather insignificant nebulosity with a yellowish tinge due to the effects of interstellar absorption. In the mid-1960s, optical studies combined with radio astronomical observations showed it to be an extremely strong thermal radio source. Later observations of other galaxies introduced the concept of starburst regions, in some cases whole galaxies, of extremely rapid star formation.  NGC 3603 is now considered to be such a region, and it has been compared by some authors to the larger cluster 30 Doradus, in the Large Magellanic Cloud.

Sher 25, the B class supergiant on the outskirts of NGC 3603, is surrounded by ejected material in an hourglass shape similar to that found for the supernova 1987A, and this has aroused intense interest in the future evolution of stars such as Sher 25.

Two of the most luminous young stars known are found within NGC 3603, but outside the central cluster.  WR 42e and NGC 3603 MTT 58 both have a spectral type of O2If*/WN6 indicating an extremely massive young star.  WR 42e is a possible runaway from a three-body encounter, while MTT 58 appears to still be embedded within its parental cocoon and is in a possible binary with an O3If star.

References

External links

 Hubble Space Telescope: Star Cluster Bursts into Life in New Hubble Image
 European Southern Observatory: The Stars behind the Curtain

 
Carina (constellation)
H II regions
3603
Star-forming regions